Jim Wilson is a film producer. He won the Academy Award for Best Picture for Dances with Wolves (1990).

Career

Producing 
In 1990, Wilson produced Dances with Wolves. It was adapted by Michael Blake, based on his novel. It was the highest-grossing Western film of all time, $424.2 million worldwide, and won 7 Academy Awards, including Best Picture, Best Director, Best Adapted Screenplay, Best Cinematography, Best Sound, Best Score, and Best Film Editing.

Following the success of Dances with Wolves, Wilson produced another hit, The Bodyguard in 1992, starring Kevin Costner and Whitney Houston. Released by Warner Bros. the film grossed $410.9 million worldwide. The soundtrack is the best-selling soundtrack in film history, selling over 44 million copies worldwide. It won the Grammy for Album of the Year.

Wilson has continued to produce films, including Wyatt Earp, The Postman and Message in a Bottle.
For television, Wilson executive-produced the award-winning 8-hour mini-series 500 Nations for CBS.

Directing 
In addition to producing studio fare, Wilson has directed numerous features, including Stacy's Knights starring Kevin Costner, Head Above Water with Cameron Diaz and Harvey Keitel, Whirlygirl with Monet Mazur and a feature-length documentary Laffit – All About Winning.

In 2014 he finished 50 to 1, about a misfit group of New Mexico cowboys who find themselves on the journey of a lifetime when they learn their crooked-footed racehorse qualifies to run in the Kentucky Derby.
Based on the true story of Mine That Bird, the cowboys must overcome impossible odds even before they reach Churchill Downs and the land of Kentucky's blue bloods.
The film was released theatrically and acquired by Sony Pictures in 2015 for all worldwide rights.

Filmography 
He was producer for all films unless otherwise noted.

Film 

As director

As an actor

As writer

Television

References

External links 
 

American film producers
Living people
Producers who won the Best Picture Academy Award
Year of birth missing (living people)